Sociae Mimae  was a guild for female stage artists, mimae (essentially singers, dancers and actresses), in Ancient Rome.  It is the only Ancient Roman guild exclusively for women of which there is currently any information.  The guild financed its own burial ground and was apparently not in any lack of funds but rather well off.

References
Citations

Sources
 Pat Easterling, Edith Hall: Greek and Roman Actors: Aspects of an Ancient Profession
 John S. Kloppenborg, Stephen G. Wilson: Voluntary Associations in the Graeco-Roman World

Guilds
Women in ancient Rome
Ancient actresses
Ancient Roman theatre